"Nisam ljubomoran" (in Serbian Cyrillic: Нисам Љубоморан) is a single by the Serbian recording artist Vlado Georgiev released in 2005. Georgiev is the author of the whole song and the song was recorded in his recording studio named 'Barba'.

Track listings
1. "Nisam ljubomoran" – 4:48
2. "Nisam ljubomoran - remix" – 4:30
3. "Nisam ljubomoran - extended remix" – 5:59

References

2005 singles
2005 songs